Geoffrey Lofthouse, Baron Lofthouse of Pontefract, JP (18 December 1925 – 1 November 2012), popularly known in his former constituency as Geoff Lofthouse, was a British Labour politician, MP and life peer.

Early life
He was born in Featherstone, West Riding of Yorkshire, the son of Ernest Lofthouse, a farm labourer in Micklefield, and Emma (née Fellows). His father died at the age of 35. At the age of 14, Geoff Lofthouse went to work at Ackton Hall Colliery in Featherstone. At age 29, he was the president of the local branch of the NUM. He went to the University of Leeds, gaining a BA in Political Studies in 1957, when he was 32 years old. In 1962, he became a councillor on Pontefract Borough Council. He was mayor of Pontefract in 1967, and leader of the council from 1969 to 1973.

Parliamentary career
He was MP for Pontefract and Castleford from a 1978 by-election until his retirement at the 1997 general election. In the House of Commons, he served from 1992 until his retirement as a Deputy Speaker of the House to Betty Boothroyd. In the Queen's Birthday Honours 1995 Lofthouse was appointed a Knight Bachelor. In the Queen's Birthday Honours 1997 Lofthouse was made a life peer as Baron Lofthouse of Pontefract, of Pontefract, in the county of West Yorkshire.

Publications
His autobiography, A Very Miner MP, is available from Yorkshire Art Circus Publishers. He also wrote a further autobiography, From Coal Sack to Woolsack.

Personal life
He married when he was 20 years old; he and his wife Sarah had a daughter.

Death
Lord Lofthouse died on 1 November 2012, aged 86.

Arms

References

External links
 Times Guide to the House of Commons, Times Newspapers Limited, 1992 and 1997 editions.
 
 
 
 Wakefield Education Yearbook 2004

1925 births
2012 deaths
Alumni of the University of Leeds
Councillors in Wakefield
Deputy Speakers of the British House of Commons
English justices of the peace
Knights Bachelor
Lofthouse of Pontefract
Labour Party (UK) MPs for English constituencies
Mayors of places in Yorkshire and the Humber
People from Featherstone
Politicians from Pontefract
Place of death missing
UK MPs 1974–1979
UK MPs 1979–1983
UK MPs 1983–1987
UK MPs 1987–1992
UK MPs 1992–1997
Life peers created by Elizabeth II